The Heimburg (also known as Burg Hohneck or Burg Hoheneck) is a castle in the village of Niederheimbach in Rhineland-Palatinate, Germany.

Notes and references

Sources and external links

Castles in Rhineland-Palatinate
Mainz-Bingen